Thomas Hlavik (born in the 1960s) is an Austrian former competitive figure skater. He is a four-time (1982–84, 1986) Austrian national champion. He trained at Cottage Engelmann Verein in Vienna, Austria.

Hlavik placed tenth at the 1981 World Junior Championships in London, England. He appeared at five European Championship, with his best result being 12th place finishes in 1982 (Lyon) and 1984 (Budapest). He also competed at four World Championships.

Competitive highlights

References 

1960s births
Austrian male single skaters
Living people
Figure skaters from Vienna